The Bagel and Becky Show (also known as Dave Cooper's The Bagel and Becky Show or simply Bagel and Becky) is an animated children's television series created by Dave Cooper, the co-creator of Nickelodeon's Pig Goat Banana Cricket, for Teletoon.  The series debuted worldwide on Teletoon+ in Poland on November 14, 2016.

Plot
The Bagel and Becky Show is about siblings Bagel the dog, Becky the cat, and their Mom as they try to make the world a better place.

Characters

Main
 Bagel (voiced by Kevin McDonald), a dimwitted and happy-go-lucky yellow dog that often gets himself and Becky into trouble.
 Becky (voiced by Nikki Payne), a cautious and intelligent black and white cat that tries to get herself and Bagel out of trouble.
 Percy (voiced by Doug Hadders), a lonely blue pigeon desperate to be friends with Bagel and Becky.

Recurring
 Mom (voiced by Ellen-Ray Hennessy), Bagel and Becky's mom who cooks up pancakes every morning.
 Loaf and Lisa (voiced by Craig Brown and Janet Porter), a gopher bear and a flying squirrel bent on destroying Bagel and Becky.
 Mayor Torgo (voiced by Michael Therriault), the mayor of Awkward Falls. He is actually an evil alien but only Becky seems to notice.
 Old Man Jenkinsbot (voiced by Michael Therriault), an intelligent robot that acts like an old person. His inventions are often misused by Bagel and Becky.
 Argentina and Phillipe (voiced by Bryn McAuley and Craig Brown), two explorers who hate when Bagel and Becky discover something before they do.
 Cyril (voiced by Michael Therriault), a barber that Bagel is terrified of.
 Skip Pauseforeffect (voiced by Craig Brown), a local television personality who hosts Bagel and Becky's favourite game shows.

Episodes

Release

Broadcast
The Bagel and Becky Show debuted on Teletoon+ in Poland on November 14, 2016, and later premiered on Teletoon in Canada on February 6, 2017. The series also aired on CITV in United Kingdom, ABC Me in Australia, Tubi in USA, RTÉ2 in Ireland and Pop in Pakistan.

References

External links

 
  on Teletoon

2010s Canadian animated television series
2016 Canadian television series debuts
2010s British animated television series
2010s British children's television series
2016 British television series debuts
2017 Canadian television series endings
2017 British television series endings
British children's animated adventure television series
British children's animated comedy television series
British children's animated fantasy television series
British children's animated musical television series
Canadian children's animated adventure television series
Canadian children's animated comedy television series
Canadian children's animated fantasy television series
Canadian children's animated musical television series
English-language television shows
Teletoon original programming
British television shows based on children's books
Canadian television shows based on children's books
Animated television series about siblings
Animated television series about cats
Animated television series about dogs
Television series by Radical Sheep Productions